Learning through play is a term used in education and psychology to describe how a child can learn to make sense of the world around them. Through play children can develop social and cognitive skills, mature emotionally, and gain the self-confidence required to engage in new experiences and environments.  

Key ways that young children learn include playing, being with other people, being active, exploring and new experiences, talking to themselves, communication with others, meeting physical and mental challenges, being shown how to do new things, practicing and repeating skills and having fun.

Definitions of work and play 
According to proponents of the concept, play enables children to make sense of their world. Children possess a natural curiosity to explore and play acts as a medium to do so. In the book Einstein Never Used Flash Cards, five elements of children's play are listed: 
Play must be pleasurable and enjoyable. 
Play must have no extrinsic goals; there is no prescribed learning that must occur.
Play is spontaneous and voluntary. 
Play involves active engagement on the part of the player. 
Play involves an element of make-believe.

Definitions of play

Creativity

Role play and pretend play involves creativity, such as: making props to use or finding objects to be used as props. Play can also be creative when the player constructs building blocks, uses paint or uses different materials to build an object. Creativity is not about the end product, but the process of the play scenario.

Imagination
Imagination is used during play when the person involved creates images in their minds to do with their feelings, thoughts and ideas. The person then uses these images in their play.

Seven common characteristics of play are listed in Playing and Learning, by Beverlie Dietze and Diane Kashin: Play is active, child-initiated, process oriented, intrinsic, episodic, rule-governed, and symbolic.

Key Characteristics of Play as an activity: 
1. Active 
2. Meaningful 
3. Symbolic
4. Voluntary or self- chosen
5. Pleasurable 
6. Process oriented

Work
There are critical differences between play and work. Play is mostly a self-chosen activity by the child, rather than prescribed by a parent or teacher; it is a process, rather than a predicted outcome or product. Work, on the other hand, has a definite intent and a prescribed outcome.

According to Dietze and Kashin:

In order for an activity to be considered play, the experience must include a measure of inner control, ability to bend or invent reality, and a strong internally based motivation for playing. If parents and educators try to label experiences as play, but in reality have specific requirements for the activity, then it becomes work not play. For example, it is really impossible to play with flash cards whose purpose is to have a child memorize something on each card. This is not playing and children quickly differentiate between pure play and work being disguised as play. 
 
Play is not wasted time, but rather time spent building new knowledge from previous experience. However, long term developmental qualities of play are difficult to research.  There are various ways in which researchers may choose to look at the differences between work and play. Researchers may choose definitions of play or work based on:
 Primary Activities: Even if a culture considers a child's action is play, a researcher may choose to define the child's action as work because it does add “ immediate worth to the family unit.”  
 The Parent's Concept: Parents from different cultures define children's actions of work and play differently. For example, a Mayan mother whose daughter sets up her own fruit stand may consider this action as play.  However, many westerners would consider this work if the child is actually successful at selling items from the fruit stand. A child in the United States who sets up a lemonade stand is considered to be working for money. 
 The Child's Concept: Children have different ideas of what play and work are in comparison to adults.

Classical, modern and contemporary perspectives 

There are three main groups of play theories:
Classical theories focus on play from the aspects of burning off excess energy; recreation and relaxation; replenishing energy after hard work; practicing future roles, and recapitulation theory (passing through successive stages by ancestors). Herbert Spencer suggests that play is a mechanism that allows humans to expend excess energy not required for survival; this can be achieved by children through play. 
Modern theories examine play from the perspective of how it impacts a child's development. According to Dietze and Kashin, “The learner is no longer regarded as a passive receiver of knowledge, but as an active constructor of meaning”. This perspective is emphasized within the constructionist theory through experiential learning. Theorist John Dewey suggests that children learn best by both physical and intellectual activity; in other words, children need to take an active role in play.
Contemporary theories focus on the relationship of play to diversity and social justice in daily living and knowledge. Children learn social and cultural contexts through their daily living experiences. The Zone of Proximal Development concept, developed by Lev Vygotsky, suggests that children require activities that support past learning and encourage new learning at a slightly-more-difficult level. Vygotsky believed that social engagement and collaboration with others are powerful forces which transform children's thinking. Urie Bronfenbrenner states that a child's development is influenced by both the person and the environment (which includes family, community, culture and the broader society). Vygotsky explained that early childhood is the period in which the lower mental functions become reconstructed for the first time in their lives into cultural tools used to transform their cognitive processes such as perception, attention, memory, and thinking (Khuluqo, 2016) .  This is similarly done in social-emotional transitions, allowing children to become “masters of their own behavior” instead of being “slaves to their environment.” (Bodrova & Leong 2015)

Cultural values of the Yucatec Maya
The way that children learn through play is culturally specific "as result of differences in childrearing beliefs, values, and practices." Play both influences and reflects the way children from different cultures learn. Most western cultures would agree with the previously described definition of play where play is enjoyable, have no extrinsic goals, no prescribed learning that must occur, is spontaneous and voluntary, involves active engagement on the part of the player, involves an element of make-believe. However, that is not so for most others. For example, the Yucatec Maya do not have emotional aspects in make-believe play, and most of their play is reality based.

Yucatec Maya commonly learn through "Intent Community Participation," an approach different from that commonly found among middle class European American families. This approach stresses observation that intertwines individuals in community action.

Unlike children from the U.S., Yucatec Maya children seldom engage in pretend play. Pretend play is considered a form of lying because children are not representing something that actually happens. For example, a Mayan mother told an ethnographer that she would "tolerate" her child pretending that the leaves in the bowl was a form of food. Instead of having imaginary circumstances and friends, they play through various real life situations that reflect everyday life of the Yucatec. For example, children go through the steps of making tortillas, weaving, and cleaning clothing. This relates to not having Age Segregation. Unlike children of the industrialized middle-class who play mainly with children of the same age, The Yucatec Mayan children engage with all ages, exploring activities of daily life.

Different cultures and communities encourage children to play in different ways. For instance, some cultures may prevent parents from joining in play, prohibit children from receiving toys, or may expect children to play in mixed age groups away from adults. They may be expected to grow out of play by 5 or in middle childhood.

Different age groups have different cognitive capabilities. For example, when older Yucatec children pretend to discipline (modeling parental structures and exploring emotions), children who are younger may react negatively because they do not understand that the discipline is a game.

Their culture also emphasizes learning through observation. Children are active participators by observing and modeling activities that are useful to the community. " It is inherently integrated into the daily activities of the compound." Their repeated realistic representations of the adult world are represented through their play.

In the first half of the twentieth century, Susan Isaacs introduced the study of play. This came from the understanding of child development that came from Western Europe and the USA. However, experts such as Gunilla Dahlberg et al. (1999) suggest that Western ways of looking at play cannot be applied cross culturally. Fleer's (1995) work with Australian aboriginal children challenges Western experts as to whether it is ideal to encourage play. She suggests that, "the children she studied did not play, and that it is not necessary for them to do so".

Importance 
Play is sufficiently important to the UN that it has recognized it as a specific right for all children. Children need the freedom to explore and play. Play also contributes to brain development. Play enables developmental in the prefrontal cortex of mammals, including humans.  Evidence from neuroscience shows that the early years of a child's development (from birth to age six) set the basis for learning, behavior and health throughout life. A child's neural pathways are influenced in their development through the exploration, thinking, problem-solving and language expression which occur during play episodes. According to the Canadian Council on Learning, "Play nourishes every aspect of children's development – it forms the foundation of intellectual, social, physical, and emotional skills necessary for success in school and in life. Play 'paves the way for learning'”.

Learning occurs when children play with blocks, paint a picture or play make-believe. During play children try new things, solve problems, invent, create, test ideas and explore. Children need unstructured, creative playtime; in other words, children need time to learn through their play. The level of emotional arousal enacted during play is ideal for consolidation and integration of neural pathways.  Allowing the child to direct the play means allowing the child to find the place most comfortable, allowing the promotion of neuroplasticity.  Within the playroom where there are endless opportunities for children to engage in self-directed play and create their own schemas allowing the integration of affect and cognition. Play also promotes neuroplasticity development by allowing children to co-construct wordless narratives of self-awareness and transformation.  (Stewart, Field, Echterling, 2016)

According to Pascel, "Play is serious business for the development of young learners. This is such an important understanding. A deliberate and effective play-based approach supports young children's cognitive development. When well designed, such an approach taps into children's individual interests, draws out their emerging capacities, and responds to their sense of inquiry and exploration of the world around them. It generates highly motivated children enjoying an environment where the learning outcomes of a curriculum are more likely to be achieved”.

In childhood 

It has been acknowledged that there is a strong link between play and learning for young children, especially in the areas of problem solving, language acquisition, literacy, numeracy and social, physical, and emotional skills. Young children actively explore their environment and the world around them through learning-based play. Play is a vital part of a child's optimal social, cognitive, physical and emotional development. Researchers agree that play provides a strong foundation for intellectual growth, creativity, problem-solving and basic academic knowledge. According to Dorothy Singer, “Through make-believe games children can be anyone they wish and go anywhere they want. When they engage in sociodramatic play, they learn how to cope with feelings, how to bring the large, confusing world into a small, manageable size; and how to become socially adept as they share, take turns and cooperate with each other. When children play, they are learning new words, how to problem solve, and how to be flexible”.

As children learn through purposeful, quality play experience, they build critical basic skills for cognitive development and academic achievement. These include verbalization, language comprehension, vocabulary, imagination, questioning, problem-solving, observation, empathy, co-operation skills and the perspectives of others.

Through play, children learn a set of skills: social skills, creativity, hand-eye coordination, problem solving and imagination. It is argued that these skills are better learned through play than through flashcards or academic drills. Additionally, Slovak researchers Gmitrova and Gmitrov have found evidence clarifying the importance of pretend play as a medium through which children can progress in areas beyond the educational curriculum. Social play will allow a child to grow confident when experimenting with new activities, and become successful at manipulating different symbol systems in a creative and more adept way. The benefits of play are so extensive that it has been deemed an evolutionary and developmentally important activity, allowing children the space to engage in socially appropriate interactions and behaviors that will serve them far into adulthood.

Beliefs about the play-learning relationship 
According to Linda Longley and colleagues, experts and parents have different beliefs about the relationship between play activities and learning. While parents ascribe more learning value to structured play activities (e.g., educational videos), experts identify structured activities as "non-play" and associate less learning value with these activities compared to unstructured activities (make-believe, or pretend, play).

Play in the classroom fosters improvements in skills needed to succeed in the transitions from preschool to kindergarten and every opportunity for play is an opportunity for growth in knowledge on subjects such as early literacy, socio-emotional skills, language, mathematics, and it does this for children from both low- and higher-income socioeconomic status. However, in spite of the recognized benefits of play in terms of academics, studies show a stead decrease in kindergartens classes allowance of play-based activities.  As public school teachers face pressure to shift their classes towards more academically focused curriculum. (Lynch, 2015)

Play-based learning 
Play develops children's content knowledge and provides children the opportunity to develop social skills, competences and disposition to learn.  Play-based learning is based on a Vygotskian model of scaffolding where the teacher pays attention on specific elements of the play activity and provides encouragement and feedback on children's learning.  When children engage in real-life and imaginary activities, play can be challenging in children's thinking. To extend the learning process, sensitive intervention can be provided with adult support when necessary during play-based learning.  Play-based learning can also be defined as:"… children being active and involved in their learning. Children learn best through first-hand experiences… the purpose of play-active learning is that it motivates, stimulates and supports children in their development of skills, concepts, language acquisitions/communication skills and concentration.  It also provides opportunities for children to develop positive attitudes and to demonstrate awareness/use of recent learning, skills and competencies, and to consolidate learning."In 2009, the DCSG outlined several benefits of the playful learning approach in the Early Years setting, including 1) that playful children use and apply their knowledge, skills and understanding in different ways and in different contexts; and 2) playful practitioners use many different approaches to engaging children in activities that help them to learn and to develop positive dispositions for learning.

This guidance goes on to state: "Practitioners cannot plan children's play, because this would work against the choice and control that are central features of play. Practitioners can and should plan for children's play, however, by creating high quality learning environments, and ensuring uninterrupted periods for children to develop their play" According to researchers Kathy Hirsh-Pasek and Roberta Michnick Golinkoff, “The level of children's play rises when adults play with them.  The variety of play children engage in also increases when adults join in.  The joining in is different from controlling. Controlling makes children follow their parents' agenda and does not lead to as much cognitive development as when parents follow their children's lead”. Play is the language and currency of children. There are several ways educators/parents/guardians can facilitate children's learning during play:
Adults can role-model positive attitudes towards play, encouraging it and providing a balance of indoor and outdoor play throughout the year. When adults join in they should guide shape, engage in and extend it, rather than dictating or dominating the play.
Orchestrate an environment by deciding what toys, materials, and equipment to be included in that environment. It is important to offer a variety of materials and experiences at varying levels of difficulty. The choice of materials is important, because it provides the motivation for children's exploration and discovery. Both indoor and outdoor experiences should provide exploratory centres and space. The play environment should allow children to make choices, and to explore play possibilities. The play environment should reflect the child's daily living experiences.
Observe carefully as children begin to use the toys, materials and equipment. Observation is an ongoing process, providing information about the child's interests, abilities and strengths and opportunities for further learning and development. Observation helps identify ways adults can build on and guide the learning.
Insinuate oneself carefully into the play activity
Listen, repeat, extend and ask questions at the right time
Extend children's natural observation by providing the language necessary to help children articulate what they see happening.  Adults can promote play and opportunities for expansive discoveries; they can enhance (or facilitate) play by encouraging children to bring their interests and experiences into the play. The adults can ask questions, to expand and enhance play.
Help children recognize the concepts that emerge as they grapple with the environment, make hypotheses, recognize similarities and differences, and solve problems
Provide social knowledge while allowing children the opportunity to learn the physical and logico-mathematical knowledge that helps them understand the world around them

Criticism of play-based learning

Knowledge acquisition 

Forty years of research has shown positive correlation between play and children's learning. This has led many to conclude that play is beneficial for all learning. However, many such findings may be reflective of procedural knowledge rather than declarative knowledge. It is not certain whether correlational research can prove or know what degree play is responsible for these advantages. The assumptions that children can learn declarative information, such as words or facts, simply based on evidence that children acquire skills in play can not be made. The true value of play is not that it can teach children facts, but that it can help them acquire important procedural knowledge, which is beneficial in acquiring declarative knowledge. In play based learning environments, the classroom is where there are endless opportunities for children to engage in self-directed play and create their own schemas allowing the integration of affect and cognition.

Pretend play: creativity, intelligence and problem solving 

Regarding creativity, meta-analysis has shown unconvincing evidence of pretend play enhancing creativity. Correlation studies have been inconsistent, with some showing relationships only to social pretend play, pretend play, or constructional play, and other studies failing to show relationships to those same constructs. In terms of intelligence, the research has claimed it is not certain whether play promotes intelligence or intelligence promotes play and other adult interventions are no different in promoting intelligence in children. For problem solving, the form of construction play is correlated with solving problems that involve construction (puzzle toys).  Further research should examine if such “play” helps problem solving generally.

Pretend play, also known as "make-believe play" involves acting out ideas and emotions. Children act out stories that contain different perspectives and ideas. Although some studies show that this type of play does not enhance child development, others have found that it has a large impact on children's language usage and awareness of the perspectives of others. Pretend play can also help with a child's self-regulation in the areas of civility, delayed gratification, empathy, and reduced aggression. It can also improve social skills such as empathy, problem solving, and communication. Play based learning experiences also provide caregivers an opportunity to assess behavioral output and intervene if a child is showing signs of developmental delay or trauma and are able to then recommend services based on those observations made during play.

Play-based learning programs 
Play-based learning programs include:
High/Scope is an example of a cognitive approach. The philosophy is that children should be involved actively in their own learning. High/Scope provides 58 Key experiences. In learning center time, they use a plan, do, review approach. This approach allows them to transcend the egocentric now while taking responsibility for directing their own learning.  Adults working with the children see themselves more as involved facilitators of play rather than managing the play itself. 
Creative Curriculum is an early childhood teaching approach that focuses on social/emotions development and focuses on project-based investigations as a way for children to apply skills and addresses the four areas on development: social/emotional, physical, cognitive, and language.  Centered around following 11 interest areas: blocks, dramatic play, toys and games, art, library, discovery, sand and water, music and movement, cooking, computers, and the outdoors as reported by the what works clearinghouse and the US department of education.
The Montessori Method emphasizes self-directed activity on the part of the child and clinical observation on the part of the teacher. The objective is to adapt the child's learning environment to his or her development level. This broad approach encourages children to learn through play. 
Ontario Full Day Early Learning Kindergarten Program, for 4- and 5-year-olds, is a school program consisting of exploration, investigation, guided and explicit instruction. 
Ontario Early Years Centres is a parent-child interactive program with a focus on play-based learning. Parents and caregivers stay with the child, and can obtain information about programs and services available for young children and their families.  
The Reggio Emilia approach, which is based upon the project approach, has a vision of the child as a competent learner, and has produced a child-directed curriculum model. The curriculum has purposeful progression, and is based on emergent curriculum, but no defined teacher-directed sequence. Teachers follow the children's interests, and provide focused instruction in reading and writing within the parameters of the project that the children select. The Reggio approach believes that children learn through interaction with others (including parents, staff and peers) in a friendly learning environment.
Project Approach for preschoolers involves children in studies of things nearby that are interests them are worth knowing more about, is more teacher instructed, but based on the children's interest and works to introduce new vocabulary and allow informal conversation opportunity (Dfuss, 2019)

See also
 Children's street culture
 Educational entertainment
Home zone / Play street

References

Further reading
 
 The Creative Curriculum for Preschool. (2013, March).
 
 
 
 
 Dfuoss. (2019). Project Approach for Preschoolers.

Alternative education
Learning
Psychology of learning
Play (activity)